Tabernaemontana solanifolia is a species of plant in the family Apocynaceae. It is found in Brazil.

References

solanifolia